Henri Kontinen (born 19 June 1990) is an inactive Finnish professional tennis player who is a former world No. 1 in doubles.

After being forced to end his singles career at a young age due to injuries, having reached a career-high ranking of No. 220, Kontinen became a successful doubles player. He is a two-time Grand Slam champion, having won the 2017 Australian Open with John Peers in men's doubles, and the 2016 Wimbledon Championships in mixed doubles alongside Heather Watson. Kontinen and Peers also won the 2016 and 2017 ATP Finals, and reached the final at the 2019 Australian Open.

He has won 21 doubles titles on the ATP Tour, and became world No. 1 for the first time on 3 April 2017, spending 26 weeks at the top of the rankings. Kontinen and Peers have also won three titles at Masters 1000 level. He has represented Finland in the Davis Cup since 2008, often alongside his younger brother, Micke, who is himself a former tennis player.

Junior career
Kontinen won the 2008 French Open boys' doubles title with Christopher Rungkat.  He reached the final of the 2008 Wimbledon boys' singles which he lost to Grigor Dimitrov having beaten Bernard Tomic in the semifinal. He also reached the final of the 2008 US Open boys' doubles with Rungkat. Subsequently, Kontinen's singles development was hampered by knee injuries, and in 2013 he decided to concentrate on doubles.

Senior career

In 2014 Kontinen won his first ATP title at the Bet-at-home Cup Kitzbühel with Jarkko Nieminen, he also played two more finals partnering Marin Draganja.

2015 was a breakthrough year for him as he won five titles including title at the Barcelona Open BancSabadell, his first ATP World Tour 500 series title. Together with Zheng Jie he reached semifinals of mixed doubles at the 2015 French Open.

His good results continued in 2016 as he won the title at the Brisbane International in January with John Peers. On April–May they won the BMW Open together. At the 2016 Wimbledon Championships he reached quarterfinals of the men's doubles tournament together with Peers and the final of the mixed doubles with Heather Watson, which they won in straight sets. On July Kontinen and Peers won the German Open Tennis Championships. On August Kontinen won the Winstom-Salem Open playing with Guillermo García-López. It was Kontinen's 10th doubles title in his career. He took the victory of St. Petersburg Open with Dominic Inglot. Kontinen and Peers had a successful end for the year as they won their first Masters title at Paris Masters and the season ending ATP World Tour Finals title. Kontinen reached the top 10 in rankings as the first Finnish tennis player ever to do so.

Kontinen and Peers won the 2017 Australian Open men's doubles championship in January 2017, and on 3 April 2017 Kontinen became world no. 1 doubles player—the first Finnish player, male or female, to do so. At Wimbledon in 2017, Kontinen and Peers lost in the semi-final to Łukasz Kubot and Marcelo Melo, the eventual champions; Kontinen also lost his no. 1 ranking to Melo. In the mixed doubles, Kontinen and Watson reached the final for the second successive year, but lost to Jamie Murray and Martina Hingis.

Significant finals

Grand Slam tournament finals

Doubles: 2 (1 title, 1 runner-up)

Mixed doubles: 2 (1 title, 1 runner-up)

Year-end championships

Doubles: 2 (2 titles)

Masters 1000 finals

Doubles: 4 (3 titles, 1 runner-up)

ATP career finals

Doubles: 30 (24 titles, 6 runner-up)

Challengers and Futures finals

Singles: 6 (5 titles, 1 runner-up)

Doubles: 28 (18 titles, 10 runner-ups)

Junior Grand Slam finals

Singles: 1 (1 runner-up)

Doubles: 2 (1 title, 1 runner-up)

Performance timelines

Doubles
Current after the 2021 Sofia Open.

Mixed doubles
Current through the  2021 Australian Open.

References

External links
 Official website 
 
 
 

Finnish male tennis players
French Open junior champions
Sportspeople from Espoo
Sportspeople from Helsinki
1990 births
Living people
Australian Open (tennis) champions
Wimbledon champions
Grand Slam (tennis) champions in men's doubles
Grand Slam (tennis) champions in mixed doubles
Grand Slam (tennis) champions in boys' doubles
ATP number 1 ranked doubles tennis players